Salas-e Babajani County (Salasi Bawajani is in Kermanshah province, Iran. The capital of the county is the city of Tazehabad. At the 2006 census, the county's population was 37,056 in 7,734 households. The following census in 2011 counted 38,475 people in 8,830 households. At the 2016 census, the county's population was 35,219 in 9,270 households, by which time Jeygaran Rural District and Sarqaleh Rural District had been separated from the county to join Sarpol-e Zahab County.

Administrative divisions

The population history and structural changes of Salas-e Babajani County's administrative divisions over three consecutive censuses are shown in the following table. The latest census shows two districts, four rural districts, and two cities.

History 

Darneh/Derne is one of the historical places in Salas-e Babajani County which mentioned by Herodotus (5th century BC)  and Ptolemy (1st century AD). For decades Darneh/ Derne has been capital of Derteng, Hulwan and Bajalan dynasties, but now is a small village in Doli Dere Region in Central District of Salas-e Babajani County.

Notable people 
Khana Qubadi (1700–1759), who lived in Derne the capital of Derteng and Bajelan dynasties located in modern day Salas-e Babajani County, translated Quran first time in history to the Kurdish language. Unfortunately, his translation book had been burned by extremists, accordingly he had to be fugitive to the Baban dynasty capital in Shahrizor. Vali Dewane is another poet who lived in Derne. The biography of Vali Dewane has been cames in love like Majnun, even more than him.

Kasra Nouri, a lawyer and Gonabadi dervish imprisoned in Tehran's Revolutionary Court, has been sentenced to two years in exile for Salas-e Babajani.

12 Nov 2017 Earthquake 

On 12 November 2017 at 18:18 UTC (21:48 Iran Standard Time, 21:18 Arabia Standard Time), an earthquake with a moment magnitude of 7.3 occurred on the Iran–Iraq border, just inside Iran, in Ezgeleh, Salas-e Babajani County, Kermanshah Province, with an epicentre approximately 30 kilometres (19 mi) south of the city of Halabja, Kurdistan Region.

References

 سلطانی، محمد علی، (1372)، ایلات و طوایف کرمانشاهان، ج 1، تهران: موفق
 Derne, the lost city in the Salas Babajani”, by Dr. Mohammad Salmasizadeg & Borhan Abasi- Scientific Specialty Journal of Research in Art and Humanity, Tehran, Second year, Number 5, Aug/ Sep 2017, ISSN: 2538-6298

 

Counties of Kermanshah Province